Millwood is an unincorporated community in Knox County, in the U.S. state of Ohio.

History
Millwood was laid out around 1825. A post office called Millwood was established in 1833, and remained in operation until 1907. Some say the community was named for the mill and woods near the original town site, while others believe the name honors one Mr. Millwood, a personal friend of the proprietor.

References

Unincorporated communities in Knox County, Ohio
1825 establishments in Ohio
Populated places established in 1825
Unincorporated communities in Ohio